Frederick William Augustus Hervey, 8th Marquess of Bristol (born 19 October 1979) is a British peer. 

After managing a Baltic property fund, based in Estonia, he is currently the chairman of Bristol Estates and founder and Chief Executive of Brickowner Residential Income PLC, a property investment company.

As Marquess of Bristol, he was a hereditary member of the House of Lords in 1999. He is also High Steward of the Liberty of St Edmund, which encompasses the whole former county of West Suffolk.

Early life
Bristol is the only son of the late 6th Marquess by his third wife, the former Yvonne Sutton. His godparents include King Fuad II and his former wife, Queen Fadila of Egypt, Prince Tomislav of Yugoslavia, Prince Nikita Romanoff of Russia, and the Countess of Dundonald. He is the brother of Lady Victoria Hervey (born 1976) and Lady Isabella Hervey (born 1982).

He was educated at St Maur School in Monaco, Sunningdale School, Eton College, and the University of Edinburgh, from which he graduated with a Bachelor of Commerce degree.

He became heir to his elder half-brother the 7th Marquess (1954–1999) in January 1998, on the death of his older half-brother Lord Nicholas Hervey (1961–1998), and succeeded to the peerages in January 1999, becoming Marquess and Earl of Bristol, Earl Jermyn of Horningsheath, and 13th Baron Hervey of Ickworth. He served briefly as a member of the House of Lords until the House of Lords Act 1999 came into effect in November.

Business career
After graduating from Edinburgh in 2002, Bristol went to live in Estonia, where for seven years he managed a Baltic property fund. He is currently the CEO and founder of the property investment platform Brickowner, as well as being the chairman of Bristol Estates, a company which owns historic property interests in Horringer, Suffolk, Great Chesterford, Essex, Sleaford,  Lincolnshire, and in Kemptown, Brighton.

Public life
Bristol is patron of several organisations, including the Gwrych Castle Preservation Trust; the Athenaeum, Bury St Edmunds; and the Friends of West Suffolk Hospital. He is Vice President of Friends of the Suffolk Record Office, Trustee of General Sir William Hervey's Charitable Trust, and founder, Trustee, and Chairman of the Ickworth Church Conservation Trust.

He is also Hereditary High Steward of the Liberty of St Edmund.

Ickworth House and Church
In 1998 the 7th Marquess sold his lease to occupy the East Wing of Ickworth House, the family seat since the 15th century. After his brother’s death on 10 January 1999, the 8th Marquess vigorously criticised the National Trust for not being willing to sell him what would have been the remaining term of that lease, arguing that the 7th Marquess could only sell his own life interest, and not that of his successors. This was disputed by the National Trust, which by 2001 had converted the East Wing into a hotel. However, in 2009 Sir Simon Jenkins, the National Trust's new chairman, stated, "I think it is in our interest for the Marquesses of Bristol to be living there".

In 2005, Bristol created the Ickworth Church Conservation Trust, to safeguard the future of St Mary's Church, Ickworth, and transferred ownership of the Church from himself to the Trust. He later led a restoration project and sourced the £1.2m required to restore the building.  He remains as Chairman and Trustee of the ICCT, which now owns and manages the Church.

Private life
In 2011 Bristol was romantically linked to the fashion model Alana Bunte.

On 11 May 2018, Lord Bristol married Meredith Dunn, an American art consultant, in a Roman Catholic wedding at the Brompton Oratory. They have a daughter, Lady Arabella Prudence Morley Hervey, born on 8 March 2020, and a son, Frederick William Herbert Morley Hervey, Earl Jermyn, born on 25 July 2022.

References 

1979 births
Living people
People educated at Eton College
108
People educated at Sunningdale School
Frederick Hervey, 8th Marquess of Bristol
Alumni of the University of Edinburgh
English expatriates in Monaco
English Roman Catholics
Younger sons of marquesses
Bristol